Mirpasand (also Romanized as Mīrpasand; also known as Shāhsavan (Persian: شاهسون), Shāhsavand (Persian: شاهسوند), and Shāhsūn) is a village in Soleyman Rural District, Soleyman District, Zaveh County, Razavi Khorasan Province, Iran. At the 2006 census, its population was 522, in 109 families.

References 

Populated places in Zaveh County